Anancylus griseatus is a species of beetle in the family Cerambycidae. It was described by Francis Polkinghorne Pascoe in 1858. It is known from Malaysia, Sumatra and Borneo.

References

Mesosini
Beetles described in 1858